Mỹ Tú is a rural district (huyện) of Sóc Trăng province in the Mekong River Delta region of Vietnam. As of 2003 the district had a population of 207,634. The district covers an area of 588 km². The district capital lies at Huỳnh Hữu Nghĩa.

References

Districts of Sóc Trăng province